Beat Gerber (born 16 May 1982) is a Swiss professional ice hockey player who is currently playing for SC Bern in Switzerland's National League (NL).

On 28 September 2017, Gerber signed a two-year contract extension with the SC Bern.

He participated at the 2011 IIHF World Championship as a member of the Switzerland men's national ice hockey team.

Awards and honours

References

External links

1982 births
Living people
HC Ajoie players
SC Bern players
SCL Tigers players
Swiss ice hockey defencemen
EHC Visp players